Deveboynu Cape (Turkish Deveboynu Burnu; Greek Krio; ;  and Triopia)  is a promontory in southwest Turkey, on the Aegean Sea, at the extreme end of the Datça Peninsula, north of the island of Rhodes. The modern town of Tekir is located there.

References

Deveboynu
Landforms of Muğla Province